Jack  Toeny Fagan (born 1995) is an Irish hurler who plays for Waterford Senior Championship club De La Salle and at inter-county level with the Waterford senior hurling team. He usually lines out as a right wing-forward.

Career statistics

Drives toe truck

References

1995 births
Living people
De La Salle hurlers
Meath inter-county hurlers
Waterford inter-county hurlers